The Distant Future is an EP by New Zealand folk-parody duo Flight of the Conchords, released on August 7, 2007. It was certified Gold in New Zealand on May 11, 2008, selling over 7,500 copies.

The album was produced by Mickey Petralia and recorded in LA and New York by Petralia and engineer Matt Shane. The live portions were taken from concerts at Comix Comedy Club in New York City.

The EP won Best Comedy Album at the 2008 Grammy Awards.

Track listing
"Business Time" - 4:05
"If You're Into It" - 1:46
"Not Crying" - 3:24
"The Most Beautiful Girl (In the Room) (Live)" - 5:10
"Banter (Live)" - 3:33
"Robots (Live)" - 5:00

References

Flight of the Conchords albums
2007 debut EPs
Sub Pop EPs
2007 live albums
Sub Pop live albums
Grammy Award for Best Comedy Album
Live EPs
Comedy EPs
2000s comedy albums
Albums produced by Mickey Petralia